Landscape park may refer to:

 Landscape park (protected area), a type of designated natural area in some countries
 Landscape garden